Jaén is a Spanish surname, after the city of Jaén. Notable people with the surname include:

Álvaro Jaén (born 1981), Spanish politician
Diana Jaén (born 1993), Panamanian model
Miguel Ángel López Jaén (born 1982), Spanish tennis player

Spanish-language surnames
Spanish toponymic surnames